Giorgos Economides (born 10 April 1990) is a Cypriot footballer who plays as a central midfielder for Karmiotissa Pano Polemdion and the Cyprus national team.

Career statistics

Club

International

Honours
APOEL
Cypriot Cup (1): 2007–08

External links
  Giorgos Economides at apoel.fc

1990 births
Living people
Cypriot footballers
Cyprus under-21 international footballers
Cyprus international footballers
Cypriot First Division players
Digenis Akritas Morphou FC players
APOEL FC players
Doxa Katokopias FC players
AC Omonia players
Association football midfielders
Greek Cypriot people
Olympiakos Nicosia players